Acanthinula spinifera is a species of minute air-breathing land snail in the family Valloniidae. It is endemic to the Canary Islands.

This snail occurs on Tenerife and La Palma. Little is known about the species, but it is thought to be rare.

References

Valloniidae
Molluscs of the Canary Islands
Gastropods described in 1872
Taxonomy articles created by Polbot
Endemic fauna of the Canary Islands